Charles Toros Avedisian (September 19, 1917 – August 26, 1983) was a professional football player in the National Football League, and later a public school administrator of athletic programs.

Early life
Born in West Hoboken, New Jersey (now part of Union City) to parents of Armenian descent, Avedisian grew up in Pawtucket, Rhode Island and graduated from Pawtucket Senior High School (now known as the William E. Tolman High School) in 1936.  He entered Providence College where he received a B.Phil degree with the class of 1941.  He later studied at Columbia University where he received an M.A. degree in 1944 and a Teachers College Professional Diploma in 1953 from Columbia for expertise in supervision of health education and physical education in schools.

New York Football Giants

Avedisian played college football at Providence College where he was co-captain of the 1940 Friar football team (Providence College no longer has a football team). He then joined the New York Giants where he played right guard under coach Steve Owen from 1942 to 1944 while he was a student at Columbia (Avedisian is one of two Providence alumni to have played for the Giants, the other being Hank Soar).  He was among over 1000 personnel in the NFL at the time who also served in the military in WWII. At 5'9" and 225 pounds he would be considered rather small by today's norm for a guard where players at this position typically exceed 6' and weigh more than 300 lbs. Avedisian was a member of some notable Giants teams. He started in a game against the Detroit Lions on November 7, 1943 at Tiger Stadium (Detroit) which ended in a scoreless tie.  No NFL game played since then has ended in a scoreless tie. The 1944 Giants are ranked as the #1 defensive team in NFL history in terms of points per game allowed, "...a truly awesome unit".  They gave up only 7.5 points per game (a record that still stands) and shut out five of their ten opponents. In one of those shutouts, a 31-0 victory over the Washington Redskins on December 10, 1944 at Griffith Stadium in Washington, DC, Avedisian (as a defensive guard) intercepted a pass thrown by Redskins great Sammy Baugh and returned it 48 yards for a touchdown. The next week the Giants lost 14-7 in the 1944 NFL Championship Game - the equivalent of today's Super Bowl - played at New York's Polo Grounds to a Green Bay Packers team coached by Curly Lambeau. The loser's share for playing in this game was $900 per player and the winning team share was $1,500  which were records at the time, but a far cry from the $49,000 losing share and $97,000 winning share for the 2016 Super Bowl. Said Avedisian in 1979, "I took my money and went to Gimbels with my wife and we bought a rug.  We still have it". Avedisian also contributed to football strategy  by his invention with Robert G. Trocolor of the "unbalanced T formation" which they described as "...the most powerful offense in football, conjoining the speed and deceptiveness of the T backfield with the power of the unbalanced line". Avedisian was inducted into the Providence College Athletic Hall of Fame in 1972 and the New Britain, Connecticut Sports Hall of Fame in 1999

Later years
During his last year with the Giants Avedisian began a career in secondary school education, first at the Columbia Grammar School in New York City where he was a biology teacher and the head football coach (his 1944 CGS football team record was 3-2-1) and then in 1945 at the Horace Mann School in Riverdale, New York where from 1945 to 1951 he taught biology and was the head football coach.  His teams compiled a record of 19-18-3.  He then embarked on a 28-year career as a public school administrator of athletic programs, first in the New Britain public school system as its Director of Athletics until 1966 and then in the Darien, Connecticut public school system as Director of Athletics where he remained until his retirement in 1980. During his period in New Britain, Avedisian was also responsible for arranging halftime performances of the New Britain High School marching band at several New York Giants games played at Yankee Stadium in the early 60s.  Avedisian received many honors for his accomplishments as a physical education administrator including the American Alliance for Health, Physical Education, Recreation and Dance's Channing Mann Award  in 1977 for excellence in the administration of athletic programs in public schools.  He was married to the former Alyce Basmajian of Providence, Rhode Island from 1944 until his death on August 26, 1983 in New Britain.  They had two children, Dr. C. Thomas Avedisian of Ithaca, New York and Carole Avedisian of North Andover, Massachusetts.

References

1917 births
1983 deaths
High school football coaches in New York (state)
Players of American football from New Jersey
Sportspeople from Union City, New Jersey

Providence Friars football players
New York Giants players
Teachers College, Columbia University alumni
People from Union City, New Jersey